"E.S.P." was a single by the Bee Gees. Released in 1987, it was the follow-up to their successful single "You Win Again". The a cappella intro found on the album version was edited out for radio airplay.

Origin and recording
The original title of the song is "XTC" or "Ecstasy" before the Gibbs realized that it sounded like a drug reference so they changed it to "E.S.P." Barry handles most lead vocal duties for this song while Robin sings a few lines and edges into falsetto for the choruses.

The demo of "E.S.P." was released in 1990 on the box set Tales from the Brothers Gibb, Like "You Win Again" it has the same drum program as the demo, and the same main vocal tracks, and it was speeded up by the same amount (103.25%), raising it a little more than a quarter tone, The finished version has a new a cappella opening and reaches the start of the demo at 0:33, There are seven edits, Both times through, four beats are dropped before the second verse ("There's danger"), The last two edits are additions going into the end, around 3:20, Not long after that the finished version has different ad lib vocals into the fade, Rhett Lawrence and Robbie Kondor are again the main musicians on the track, with Reb Beach. The finished version also features Robin screaming, unlike the demo where Barry's falsetto has a major presence. Brief studio footage of the brothers recording the vocals appeared in a German interview with Sabine Sauer.

Single release
The second single did much less well than "You Win Again", reaching only number 13 in Germany and outside the top forty elsewhere. Warner Bros. pushed "E.S.P." even more heavily with many alternate mixes on 12-inch singles and promo discs. The reprise, a piece of the a cappella opening, was used as the closing number of the album.

The B-side "Overnight" featured lead vocals by Maurice Gibb.

Personnel
 Barry Gibb – lead, harmony and backing vocals
 Robin Gibb – lead and backing vocals
 Maurice Gibb – backing vocals
 Robbie Kondor – keyboards
 Rhett Lawrence – drum programming, synthesizer
 Marcus Miller – bass
 Reb Beach – electric guitar

Charts

Year-end charts

References

1987 singles
1987 songs
Bee Gees songs
Song recordings produced by Arif Mardin
Song recordings produced by Barry Gibb
Song recordings produced by Robin Gibb
Song recordings produced by Maurice Gibb
Songs written by Barry Gibb
Songs written by Maurice Gibb
Songs written by Robin Gibb
Warner Music Group singles
Warner Records singles